Endoxyla lituratus is a moth of the family Cossidae. It is found throughout Australia.

The wingspan is about 70 mm. Adults have a streaky speckled fawn pattern on their wings. The abdomen is banded in brown and grey.

The larvae bore through the wood of Acacia species, making a honeycomb like structure of tunnels. Pupation takes place in that borehole. The life cycle can take up to four years.

References

Endoxyla (moth)
Moths described in 1805